Central South Philadelphia, commonly known as either just South Philadelphia or "South Philly," is a neighborhood in South Philadelphia.  It is generally bounded by Broad to 9th Streets (west to east) and Mifflin to Shunk (north to south).  The entire neighborhood falls under the 19148 zip code. The neighborhood has a large Italian American population.

Education
The neighborhood is zoned to the School District of Philadelphia.

Zoned schools in the community include:
Francis Scott Key School (K-6)
Southwark School (K-8) - Students zoned to Key who are in grades 7-8 attend Southwark.

Students zoned to Southwark and to Key are also zoned to South Philadelphia High School.

Edward W. Bok Technical High School, a magnet school, formerly operated in the neighborhood.

Bok, Key, and Southwark are listed on the National Register of Historic Places.

Demographics
 Racial break down is roughly the following: White - 74%; Black - 11%; Asian - 11%; Other - 5% 
 Women make up 53.4% of the population; men make up 46.6% of the population.

(These statistics apply to the entire 19148 zip code, not this specific neighborhood; Central South Philadelphia makes up the majority of 19148.)

Community resources
Central South Philadelphia is serviced by several civic organizations.  They work together under the broad heading of the Central South Philadelphia Civic Association Alliance.

The community has a branch of the Philadelphia Free Library, located right next to the former Samuel Fels Community center.

Public transportation
The neighborhood is serviced by a plethora of SEPTA bus lines and is also accessible from the Oregon, Snyder, and Tasker-Morris stops on the Broad Street Line

References

External links
South Philly Review
Philadelphia Free Library: Fumo Family Branch

.
Neighborhoods in Philadelphia
Little Italys in the United States
Italian-American culture in Philadelphia